Mosques in Kolkata refers to mosques in the city of Kolkata (earlier known as Calcutta), in India.

Kolkata is the capital city of West Bengal, a state in the eastern part of India. The city is more than 300 years old (as Kolkata) and was the capital of British India till early 1911. Kolkata hosts many churches, temples and mosques, along with other religious places. Muslims have been settling in Calcutta since the early 19th century, but the pace was accelerated from the 1860s onwards, mainly due to the harsh economic conditions in Bihar and the United Provinces of Agra and Oudh.

There are nearly 450 mosques (known as masjid in Urdu and Bengali) in Kolkata (from Ward 1 to Ward 141). Density is highest in the wards in the central part of the city, where the density of the Muslim population is higher.  The most famous is the::
Basri Shah Mosque, on 8 Sett Pukur Road, which was built in 1804. It is the oldest mosque of Kolkata.
Nakhoda Masjid, on Zakariya Street and Rabindra Sarani crossing near Burrabazar, which was built in 1926. There are many beautiful and old mosques. Other famous and large mosques in Kolkata include the 
Tipu Sultan Mosque; the 
Rajabazar Barri Masjid; the 
Colootolla Chhoti Masjid; the 
Ahl-e-Hadees Masjid on Marquis Lane near Alimuddin Street; the 
Habib-ul-Masaajid on Rafi Ahmed Kidwai Road, the 
Masjid-e-Mohammadi in Park Circus; the 
Jumma Masjid in Mullickbazar, the 
Lal Masjid in Colootolla; and the 
Karbala Masjid in Metiabruz, which is Shia in orientation, while the rest all follow the Sunni faith.
Two Haqqani Masjid of Haqqani Anjuman(established by Murshid Maulana Sufi Mufti Azangachhi Shaheb) is also available in Kolkata. One is at Bagmari and the second is at Near Maniktala where after every Namaz Haqqani Wazifa is being read together with in community of all Namajee.
Ahmadiyya Masjid on New Park Street in Park Circus.

Like all growing cities, space is a problem in Kolkata. To accommodate the growing population, most of the mosques are expanding vertically. The structures are also getting changed from old style to new style, and the way of construction is changing.

In 1942, the last mosque was built in Kolkata (in Entally).

References

Mosques in West Bengal
Religious buildings and structures in Kolkata
Lists of mosques in India